"Kal Ho Naa Ho" ( Tomorrow may never come) is a 2003 Hindi-language filmi song performed by Sonu Nigam for the 2003 Indian romantic drama film of the same name. 

The track was composed by Shankar–Ehsaan–Loy, while lyrics were written by Javed Akhtar. In a pathos version, Nigam is joined by Alka Yagnik and Richa Sharma. Kal Ho Naa Ho was directed by Nikhil Advani and written by Karan Johar; the latter co-produced it with his father Yash Johar under the banner of Dharma Productions. 

The music video of "Kal Ho Naa Ho" features leads Shah Rukh Khan, Saif Ali Khan, and Preity Zinta.
Sonu Nigam was busy when the song was to be recorded. Instead of opting for some other singer, Karan Johar decided to wait for a month before Sonu came back and recorded the song for the movie

The song was featured in Outlook's list of Bollywood's Timeless Melodies, making it the only contemporary selection on the list. It quickly became popular upon release.

Music video
Aman imagines himself in Rohit's place, romancing Naina, and wistfully sings of life's unpredictability and making the most of life.

Production
The theme of the song was composed by Loy Mendonsa of the Shankar-Ehsaan-Loy trio and Shankar Mahadevan arranged the groove.

In a later interview in the documentary "Pancham unmixed", Shankar, Ehsaan and Loy revealed that the music of the segment "har pal yahaan" in the song was inspired by the music of R.D.Burman.

Reception and legacy
Awards
 National Film Award for Best Male Playback Singer - Sonu Nigam
 IIFA Best Male Playback Award - Sonu Nigam
 Filmfare Best Male Playback Award - Sonu Nigam
 IIFA Best Lyricist Award - Javed Akhtar
 Filmfare Best Lyricist Award - Javed Akhtar

The song was featured in Outlook magazine's  20 Best Hindi Film Songs Ever list. The jury was composed of celebrities such as Gulzar, Hariharan, Javed Akhtar, Kumar Sanu and Shantanu Moitra. Each jury member was asked to nominate 10 favorites and the songs the winners were ranked according to the number of votes each song got. "Kal Ho Naa Ho" was ranked at 19 making it the only contemporary selection in the list.

The track was featured in Hindustan Times's "Song of the Century" list, which described the song as "one of the most unforgettable tunes in recent times."

The song became immensely popular among Telugu audiences after an episode of Bigg Boss Telugu, Season 4 where Mehaboob Shaikh, a popular contestant, was eliminated, when, before leaving, he performed on the song.

References

Indian songs
Hindi film songs
Songs with music by Shankar–Ehsaan–Loy
Songs with lyrics by Javed Akhtar
Sonu Nigam songs